One Man is the second studio album by American recording artist Tank. It was released on October 28, 2002, by Blackground Records and  Universal Records.

Critical reception

Dan LeRoy of AllMusic rated One Man two and a half out of five stars. He wrote that "ever the sensitive guy, R&B loverman Tank thoughtfully divides his sophomore disc in two, front-loading it with tender, sexed-up balladry and saving the up-tempo stuff for the second half. On the surface, it's an especially welcome gesture because, in the reverse of how this formula usually works, Tank is much more likely to lose listeners when he aims for the dancefloor than the bedroom."

Track listing

Sample credits
"Supa Sexy" contains an interpolation from "Sexual Healing" as performed by Marvin Gaye.
"Make Me Wanna Sing" contains a sample "Lovin' You" as performed by Minnie Riperton.
"Let Me Live" contains melody and lyrics of "All Around the World" as performed by Lisa Stansfield.

Charts

References

2002 albums
Tank (American singer) albums
Universal Records albums